Ascaloptynx appendiculata is a species of owlfly in the family Ascalaphidae. It is found in Central America and North America.

References

Further reading

 

Ascalaphidae
Articles created by Qbugbot
Insects described in 1793